The Premier of the Punjab was the head of government and the Leader of the House in the Legislative Assembly of Punjab Province in British India. The position was dissolved upon the Partition of India in 1947.

History 
The office was created under the Government of India Act 1935. The Unionist Party was the principal legislative force in the province. It received support from legislators of the Punjab Muslim League, the Indian National Congress and the Sikh Akali Dal at various periods. The Unionist government implemented agrarian reforms in Punjab by using legal and administrative measures to relieve farmers and peasants of crippling debt. Similar steps were taken by the Prime Minister of Bengal. The Unionists opposed the Quit India movement and supported the Allies during World War II. The Unionists were constitutionalists who favored cooperation with the British to achieve independence from the Raj.

The Unionists signed the Lucknow Pact with the All India Muslim League (AIML) in 1937. The Punjab premier supported the drafting of the Lahore Resolution in 1940. In 1941, the premiers of Punjab and Bengal joined the Viceroy's defence council against the wishes of the AIML. The second Punjab premier joined the Paris Peace Conference in 1946.

Premiers of the Punjab (1937-1947)

Legacy
The office was succeeded by the Chief Minister of Punjab (Pakistan) and Chief Minister of Punjab (India).

See also
Legislatures of British India

References

Provinces of British India
Prime Ministers of British India